The Curtiss PN-1 was an American single-seat night fighter biplane built by Curtiss Aeroplane and Motor Company using blueprints from the Engineering Division of the United States Army Air Service.

Development
Designed by the USAAC, the PN-1 was a welded steel tube fuselage covered by fabric. The wings were wood covered by fabric. One of the two prototypes ordered was built, and underwent static testing at McCook Field. It may have undergone flight testing, but no orders were received.

Specifications

References

Notes

Bibliography

PN-01
1920s United States fighter aircraft
Single-engined tractor aircraft
Biplanes
Aircraft first flown in 1921